Georges Gueril (born October 28, 1909, in French Guiana, and died March 2, 1977, in Cayenne) was a politician from French Guiana who served in the French Senate from 1959 to 1962 .

References 
 page on the French Senate website

French Guianan politicians
French people of French Guianan descent
French Senators of the Fifth Republic
1909 births
1977 deaths
Senators of French Guiana